San Ildefonso, officially the Municipality of San Ildefonso is a 1st class municipality in the province of Bulacan, Philippines. According to the 2020 census, it has a population of 115,713 people.

With the continuous expansion of Metro Manila, the municipality is now part of Manila's built-up area which makes San Ildefonso its northernmost part.

History
The early inhabitants called this town Bulak because of the abundant 'kapok' trees ('bulak' in vernacular) growing on the hill where the town is now.

Bulak was then a barrio of San Rafael. There were only about 3,000 inhabitants. The early inhabitants were people from neighboring towns and provinces who preferred to settle in this place because of its good agricultural prospects.

When the Spaniards came, the name Bulak was changed to Hacienda San Juan de Dios because 15,500 hectares of grazing and farming grounds were claimed by the friars. The people were told to pay tribute. Proceeds from the rentals were used to finance the operation of the San Juan de Dios Hospital in Manila. The Spanish friars, though antagonistic toward the Filipinos, admired the beauty of the natural scenery. They changed the name to Hacienda Buenavista (which means beautiful scenery in Spanish).

As the population grew, a chapel was constructed under the parochial jurisdiction of San Rafael. In 1809, Father Juan dela Rosa was named the first Filipino priest of the town. He held the position until 1811. He was responsible for changing the name Bulak to San Ildefonso in honor of Alfonso XII, then the king of Spain, and San Ildefonso, its patron saint. By the time it was given this name, a tribunal was created finally making it a town in 1877. Between 1905 and 1906, San Ildefonso was merged with San Miguel due to its low income and inability to finance its expenditures in operating the local government.

As years went by, more and more people were induced to live in the town. The growth of population promoted an increase of income. The town became capable of meeting its expenses so it ceased being a barrio of San Miguel and became once again an independent town.

During the Japanese occupation of the Philippines in 1942 the mansion Bahay na Pula of the Ilusorio family was confiscated by the Imperial Japanese Army and used as barracks and became a place where local so-called comfort women were forced to work.

Geography

Barangays
San Ildefonso is politically subdivided into 36 barangays (6 urban, 30 rural).

Climate

Demographics

Economy 

Major industries
Cement 
 Pyrotechnics
 Feed mills
 Food/food processing
 Garments 
 Hat making
 Wood crafts
 High-yield crops
 Marble/marble processing
 Metalcraft

Major products
 Bakeries and sweet preserves
 Chicharon
 Poultry and livestock
 Rice
 High value crops
 Marbles
 Vegetables
 Fruits

Education

Public Schools

Elementary Education
The town has numerous public schools offering elementary and high school education. Some of the elementary public schools are:

South District

North District

Secondary Education
Some of the public high schools are:

Tertiary and College Education 
Some of the tertiary schools are:

Private Schools 
Some of the private schools offering education

Notable personalities
 Yuka Saso – 2021 U.S. Women's Open Golf Champion. Filipino Japanese amateur golfer. Two-time Asian Games gold medalist in individual and team events.
 Paula Carla G. Tan - the town's mayor, widely popular among netizens because of her response to the COVID-19 pandemic despite her town being one of the most affected by the virus.
Cardozo Luna - politician; Undersecretary of Department National Defence.

Gallery

References

Further reading

External links

 [ Philippine Standard Geographic Code]
San Ildefonso municipal website
2007 Philippine Census Information

Municipalities of Bulacan